Zara Sheikh (Punjabi) is a Pakistani model and actress. Sheikh has acted in films such as Tere Pyar Mein (2000), Salakhain (2004) and Laaj (2003). She won the Nigar Award for Best Actress for her performance in film Tere Pyar Mein and Lux Style Award for Best Actress for her performance in ‘Laaj’.

Career

Modelling 
Zara Sheikh started her more than a decade long modelling career even before stepping into movies at a very young age. She started out with photographer Khawar Riaz, and till date, is named as one of his most successful models. Due to her unconventional looks, slender frame and height, Zara was an instant favourite for all leading designers. She has graced the covers of almost all Pakistani magazines, and appeared in campaigns for almost all leading brands, including Deepak Perwani, Aasia Saail, Salina Wardah, Nee Punhal, Dawn Bread, Mobilink, Rite Biscuits, Golden Chips, Coca-Cola, Head & Shoulders, Dabur Amla, 7up, Meezan, Gul Ahmed, Nishat, Levi's, Crossroads, Lajwanti, to name a few.

Unlike most Pakistani models, her fashion career, despite entering movies in 2000, continued for a long time owing to get ability to totally transform for each shoot.

Films 
Zara Sheikh made her cinema screen debut in 2000, through film director Hassan Askari's Tere Pyar Mein, in which she played the role of an Indian Sikh girl, who falls in love with a Pakistani banker. Sheikh received the Nigar's Best Actress award for her role in the film.

In 2002, she appeared in Sajjad Gul's Chalo Ishq Larain. A year later, in 2003, Sheikh played the part of a Hindu girl, Ram Khori, who converts to Islam, in Laaj (means Honour in English), a love tale set in the backdrop of 1947 partition of India and Pakistan.

In 2004, Zara Sheikh worked in the 150 minute, Shahzad Rafique-directed Salakhain (translated as The Bars).

In 2006, Zara Sheikh played the role of a girl-in-love in the Mubashir Lucman-directed Pehla Pehla Pyar (The First Love), a film partly filmed in Thailand. Speaking of her experience, post-production, Sheikh said, "It's not easy to work with Mubasher. He's motivated by his film a lot and does not believe in any compromises." She also stated that, at one point she had worked twenty-eight hours at a stretch, but that when I saw the result on the screen afterwards, I was in tears because it was clearly worth it."

In 2019, she starred in Heer Maan Ja).

Singing
In 2002, Zara Sheikh collaborated with Ali Haider to playback sing three musical numbers for her movie Chalo Ishq Larain.

Filmography

Film

Television

Accolades

Music videos
"Gal V Na Kare" – Wet Metals
 "O' Sanam" (O' Love!) –Yasir Akhter
 "Ghar Aya Mera" (Mine, Came Home) – Tulsi
 "Khamaj" – Fuzon
 "Punjabi Touch" – Abrar-ul-Haq
 Hum Ek Hain (We Are One) – Shehzad Roy
 "Atom Bomb (Jee Chaey)" – Faakhir
 "Tu Hi Meri Aas" – Usman Malik

See also 
 List of Pakistani actresses

References

External links
 

Living people
20th-century Pakistani actresses
21st-century Pakistani actresses
Actresses from Lahore
Nigar Award winners
Pakistani female models
Pakistani film actresses
Punjabi people
Year of birth missing (living people)